Monimopetalum is a monotypic genus of flowering plants belonging to the family Celastraceae. The only species is Monimopetalum chinense.

Its native range is China.

References

Celastraceae
Celastrales genera
Monotypic rosid genera